The NASCAR Whelen Southern Modified Tour (WSMT) was a stock car racing series owned by NASCAR and operated in the Southeastern United States as part of its Modified Division. The series began in 1989 as the Southern Modified Auto Racing Teams (S.M.A.R.T.) before NASCAR took over the series in 2005. The Whelen Southern Modified Tour used nearly identical rules as its northeastern-based counterpart the NASCAR Whelen Modified Tour.

The series merged with the Modified Tour in 2017.

The series came back in late 2020 without NASCAR sanction under the SMART Tour name and will run its first full season since 2004 in 2021 with the likes of Bobby Labonte and Ryan Preece competing.

History

NASCAR itself has a long tradition of Modified racing in the Southeastern U.S., prior to the formation of today's Northeast-based Whelen Modified Tour in 1985. The evolution of Modified racing began in the late 1940s with the first NASCAR sanctioned race taking place at the Daytona Beach course in February, 1948. Coupes and sedans were the vehicles of choice and provided a new form of entertainment as tracks began to spring up all over the country. NASCAR Modified teams competed in championship events up and down the east coast, including stops at Bowman Gray Stadium in Winston-Salem, North Carolina, North Wilkesboro Speedway and Martinsville Speedway. Top drivers from North Carolina and Virginia, such as Ralph Brinkley, Ray Hendrick and Satch Worley, were regular NASCAR Modified competitors.

In the late 1980s, while modified racing was maintaining its popularity in the Northeast, Late Model Stock cars moved into the spotlight throughout the South. The downward slide suffered by the Southern Modifieds made many people feel that the division was fading, and quite possibly disappearing altogether from the region.

The S.M.A.R.T. TOUR Era
In September 1988, after a rain-out in Myrtle Beach, South Carolina, a group of dedicated car owners and drivers banded together and formed the Southern Modified Auto Racing Teams, or S.M.A.R.T., as they became known to race fans throughout the region. The group set as its goal to strive to return Modifieds to their previous state of popularity in the South. For the next 16 years, Modified racing through the S.M.A.R.T. Tour raced at tracks throughout the Carolinas and Virginia.

1989 season

The Inaugural Season included a total of six races. The schedule had two races each at North Wilkesboro and Pulaski County, and one race each at Langley and Myrtle Beach. The first race in series history was on April 9, 1989, at Langley Speedway in Hampton, VA. Eighteen modifieds entered the inaugural event. Frank Fleming's pole-winning lap of 15.990 seconds (89.660 mph) for the event was the quickest in Langley's history. Robert Jeffreys earned the honor of being the first race winner by holding off Philip Smith. At the Lowes 150 on April 15 at North Wilkesboro Speedway, driver Don Smith had to be cut from his car after crashing on the second lap. Smith had a broken left shoulder from the crash. Northern Modified superstar Jimmy Spencer won in his only career S.M.A.R.T. start after recovering from a mid-race crash to finish two car-lengths ahead of Gary Myers. The season concluded at Pulaski County Speedway on October 15. Johnny Bush grabbed his only career series victory while Philip Smith was crowned the tour's inaugural champion. In the first season there were six different winners, with no driver winning more than one event.

1990 season

The second season grew to eight races. The season began at Hickory Motor Speedway on March 31, and ended on September 29 at Caraway Speedway. North Wilkesboro was the only track to hold more than one event (two races were held there). This was the first season that had a race held at Caraway Speedway, which would later hold the most races in series history. Junior Miller won his first career series win at the season opener at Hickory Motor Speedway. It wasn't until April 21st at North Wilkesboro Speedway (the third race of the year and the ninth race in series history) that a driver became a repeat winner in the series. Robert Jeffreys held off Jimmy Spencer to win his second career SMART race. Jay Hedgecock became the first repeat winner of the 1990 season at Pulaski County, holding off Johnny Bryant and Frank Fleming. The race was stopped on lap 73 because of an accident with the cleanup truck. After a blown engine, the track safety truck lost the Stay-Dry spreader, dumping the chemical all over the second turn and causing a red flag for 17 minutes. Jay Hedgecock ended the year at Caraway Speedway with his third consecutive victory and fifth triumph in the eight-race season. There were only three winners during the season: Jay Hedgecock, Junior Miller and Robert Jeffreys. Jay Hedgecock dominated the season and won the season championship.

1991 season

The third season held seven races, starting off with the season opener on April 13 at Concord Motorsport Park, and ending on October 5 at Lanier Speedway. The event at Lanier Speedway, in Braselton, GA, was the first event held outside of Virginia and the Carolinas. Junior Miller dominated the Motor Mile Speedway event, leading all but 25 laps of the race and holding off pole winner Jay Hedgecock. Hedgecock had to be treated for exhaustion after driving the entire race without power steering. Philip Smith dominated the race at North Wilkesboro, leading the last 91 laps en route to his only 1991 victory. The only other leader of the race, pole sitter Gary Myers (son of late NASCAR driver Billy Myers and better known as the father of Jason Myers and Burt Myers), fell out with mechanical issues. Junior Miller claimed both his third victory of the season and his first S.M.A.R.T. season title at the season finale at Lanier Speedway. There were five winners during the season. Junior Miller won the most races during the season with three wins.

1992 season

The 1992 season held 13 races, nearly twice as many as any previous season. The season began on April 11 at North Wilkesboro Speedway, and ended on November 3 at Caraway Speedway. Tour races were held at Bowman Gray Stadium for the first time. In the season opener, Paul Spencer, brother of NASCAR's Jimmy Spencer, claimed his only series victory by holding off Jay Hedgecock. Bobby Hutchens was the pole winner for the race but fell out on the 13th lap due to a mechanical failure. There were six winners during the season. Frank Fleming won the most races during the season with four wins, but Jay Hedgecock would claim his second series championship at the end of the season, becoming the first multiple time championship winner of the series.

1993 season

The 1993 Season held 10 races. The season began at Caraway Speedway on March 13, and also ended at Caraway Speedway on October 30. There were seven winners during the season, the most in a season for the series. Junior Miller won three races, the most wins by any driver during the season, and claimed his second series championship, beating Philip Smith by just 17 points.

1994 season

The 1994 season held nine races. The seasoneason began at Caraway Speedway on April 2, and again ended at Caraway Speedway on October 30. At the season opener, Tim Arre began his ascension, holding off early race leader Frank Fleming for his first S.M.A.R.T. victory. There were six winners during the season, with Tim Arre scoring the most wins with three. Arre would win the 1994 season championship.

1995 season

The 1995 season held 10 races. The season began at Summerville Speedway on April 1, and ended at Caraway Speedway on October 29. At the season opener, defending series champ Tim Arre started his title defense off well by winning the event. Tim Arre won his fifth and his final series race at Myrtle Beach Speedway on September 2, holding off Gary Myers after the duo swapped the lead multiple times during the event. At Franklin County Speedway on October 7, Jay Foley captured his first series victory, leading the last 69 laps. This race had a significance to Kenny Minter. Minter was racing in memory of his dad, winning the pole and leading the first 81 laps. However, a two-tire stop doomed Minter to 14th. Tragedy struck during the final season race at Caraway Speedway. On lap 87 of the 200 lap race, the cars of Kenny Minter and Brian King touched entering Turn 3, and Minter's car slammed the outer retaining wall before coming back across and coming to rest in Turn 4. Minter was taken to Randolph Memorial Hospital in Asheboro, where he was pronounced dead from his injuries. There were five different winners during the season. Junior Miller won the most races, with five, and his third season championship (by 145 points over runner-up Bobby Hutchens).

1995 top 10 points standings

1996 season

The 1996 season held 12 races. The season began on March 30 at Summerville Speedway, and ended at Caraway Speedway on October 27. Gary Myers avenged a heartbreaking loss in the 1995 Summerville race to claim victory in the 1996 season opener at Summerville. Frank Fleming won the final S.M.A.R.T. event at North Wilkesboro Speedway on September 14. There were five different winners during the season. Frank Fleming and Junior Miller tied for the most victories, with four each. Gary Myers won the season championship by just 10 points over runner-up Frank Fleming, and by 74 points over third place finisher Jay Foley. Myers's car owner, 1989 champion Phillip Smith, had retired from regular competition in 1995 to become a car owner.

1997 season

The 1997 season only held five races, four of which were at Caraway Speedway. The July 4th event at Tri-County Motor Speedway was the season opener, after rain canceled the April 12th scheduled season opener at Caraway Speedway. The season ended at Caraway Speedway on September 27. 
Jay Foley became the only driver other than Junior Miller to win a S.M.A.R.T. Modified race in 1997, winning the prestigious Myrtle Beach event on August 30. Junior Miller won by making a decisive pass of Frank Fleming on the 121st lap at the September 6th race. At the season finale to the abbreviated season, Junior Miller went 4-for-5, winning both the finale and the championship title. Miller was under severe pressure from Frank Fleming late in the race, but Fleming hit the wall late, setting up a three-lap dash for the checkered. This was Miller's fourth championship in the series.

1998 season

The 1998 season, the tenth season of the series, had an increase of events, to 9 races. The season began on April 11 at Caraway Speedway, and ended at Caraway Speedway on October 11. Frank Fleming made it a season sweep at Tri-County Motor Speedway on September 19, by holding off Burt Myers. In the season finale, Jay Hedgecock won the race but it was Junior Miller who was crowned the 1998 champion. There were five different winners during the season. Junior Miller won the most victories, with three. This was Junior Miller's second straight year, and fifth time in series history, that he had won the championship.

1999 season

The 1999 season held 13 races. The season began on March 27 at Summerville Speedway, and ended at Caraway Speedway on November 1. Frank Fleming claimed the season opener victory by holding off Junior Miller. Burt Myers won his first series race on September 4 at Myrtle Beach Speedway. Junior Miller dominated the B-99 500, leading all 150 laps en route to victory over Jay Foley and points rival Gary Myers. Miller left the event 70 points ahead of Myers. Miller continued to dominate the circuit at the next event, rolling to his third consecutive victory. At the Kenny Minter Memorial 150, Jay Hedgecock won his second race of the year. Meanwhile, Miller headed into the championship finale with a 73-point cushion on Myers in the battle for the title. Hedgecock ended the year with his second consecutive victory, holding off pole winner Frank Fleming. Despite only finishing 12th, Junior Miller claimed the championship. There were six different winners during the season. Junior Miller again won the most events with four wins during the season. The 1999 season Championship was Miller's third straight championship and the sixth of his career.

2000 season

The 2000 season held 11 races. The season began on April 1 at Caraway Speedway, and ended at Caraway Speedway on October 29. At the season opener, rising Northern Modified star L.W. Miller claimed victory, holding off Junior Miller. Junior Miller won his first race of the year at the next event, at Coastal Plains Raceway, holding off a young Brian Loftin. Junior Miller won for the fourth time at the September 23rd event, holding off Burt Myers in a thrilling last-lap duel. Northern Modified star Ed Flemke, Jr. won his only series race, holding off L.W. Miller at the Advance Auto Parts 150. At the Kenny Minter Memorial 150, Gary Myers won his second race of the season, holding off Frank Fleming. Junior Miller finished third to clinch the season championship with one race yet to go. There were six different divers to win a race during the season. Junior Miller led all drivers, with four wins. Miller won the season championship, making it his fourth straight championship (by 152 points over runner-up Frank Fleming). It was Miller's 7th S.M.A.R.T. championship of his career and the last under the S.M.A.R.T. name.

2000 top 10 points standings

2001 season

The 2001 season held 13 races. The Season began on April 7 at Caraway Speedway, and ended on November 10 at South Boston Speedway. Jay Foley started the year off by winning the first two events. Junior Miller had dominated the second event but was taken out in a late crash. Junior Miller would claim his first victory of the season at the next event, the Jockey Lot 150, by holding off Gary Myers. Doug Wolcott claimed his first series victory, by dominating the last third of the race at Langley Speedway en route to victory over Frank Fleming. At the Alco Yamaha of Asheboro 150, Burt Myers grabbed his first victory of the season in convincing fashion, dominating the second half of the race and holding off his father, Gary Myers. Jay Foley had late issues after leading most of the early part of the race, finishing in 13th. At the season closing Bailey's 150, Gary Myers won his second race of the year, passing Ed Flemke, Jr. in the final ten laps. Jay Foley finished third to claim his first and only tour championship. Foley beat Burt Myers by 45 points for the championship. There were seven different divers to win a race during the season. Jay Foley won the most events, with four wins. Foley's championship ended Junior Miller's streak of four straight championships.

2001 top 10 points standings

2002 season

The 2002 season held 10 races. The season opener was on April 6 at Summerville Speedway, after a race at Caraway Speedway the previous week was cancelled due to rain. The season ended on October 27 at Caraway Speedway. Burt Myers started the year on top, winning the season opener by holding off Frank Fleming. Bob Park won his only career S.M.A.R.T. race at the next event, the Triad Neat Sweep 150, holding off Burt Myers. Frank Fleming won his 21st & final S.M.A.R.T. race at the September 7th event at Caraway Speedway, holding off Jay Foley. Junior Miller ended the year with three consecutive victories, but Burt Myers would hold on to claim his only S.M.A.R.T. championship, by 86 points over Miller. There were six different winners during the season. Burt Myers and Junior Miller tied for the most wins with three each. Burt Myers joined his father, the 1996 Champion, as the first father-son champions in the series.

2002 top 10 points standings

2003 season

The American Speed Association became the sanctioning body of the series in 2003, and the tour was renamed the ASA S.M.A.R.T. Tour. The 2003 season was the 15th season of the Tour. There were 10 races were held that season. The season began on March 29 at Caraway Speedway, and ended on October 12 at Friendship Motor Speedway. At the season opener, Jay Hedgecock took home the winner's trophy, dominating the second half of the race while holding off Jeff Fultz. A crash near the end of the race left driver Puddin Swisher injured, and he had to be airlifted from the event. John Smith was the surprise winner of the Summerville 150, holding off L.W. Miller for his only career S.M.A.R.T. era victory.  L.W. Miller won an amazing six consecutive victories between April 12th and September 1st, a series record for consecutive victories. At the Concord 150, Jay Hedgecock won for the third time of the season, slipping past the dominant car of Gary Myers in the waning laps. Hedgecock also used the win to slash two-thirds off L.W. Miller's points lead as they headed into the season finale. In the season finale, Jay Foley claimed his only victory of the season, holding off L.W. Miller. Miller couldn't be too upset with his efforts, however, as he was crowned S.M.A.R.T. champion for the first time in his career (by just 51 points over two-time champion Jay Hedgecock). There were only five different winners during the season.

2003 top 10 points standings

2004 season

The 2004 season held 13 races. The season began on March 27 at Caraway Speedway, and ended on October 17 at Friendship Motor Speedway. At the season opener, Michael Clifton won his only career series race, holding off Junior Miller in the waning laps.  L.W. Miller won his second consecutive race at the Caraway 150 (April 10th), moving the dominant car of Jay Hedgecock out of the way on a green-white-checkered. Insult would later be added to injury for Hedgecock, as his car was disqualified for a technical violation discovered in post-race inspection. Jay Hedgecock overcame the disappointment of the previous week, holding off L.W. Miller for the victory in the Caraway 150 (April 17th). Burt Myers won his only race of the year at the Friendship 150 (May), holding off his brother Jason. Jay Foley captured a dominating victory at the Friends of Friendship 150, leading all but the first two laps en route to a wide margin of victory over runner-up Burt Myers. At the Caraway 150 (July), L.W. Miller grabbed yet another victory at his favorite track, sneaking into the lead with just a dozen laps to go and holding off Jay Hedgecock for the trophy. Brian Loftin began a hot streak at the ASA/S.M.A.R.T. 150, going on to win four of the final six races of the season. Lofton held off Junior Miller for the victory at historic Myrtle Beach. The race was certainly competitive, as a season-high seven lead changes punctuated the event. Loftin would slip by the dominant Jay Hedgecock with just thirteen laps to go, and never looked back. Ironically, Hedgecock would lose the next race, at Caraway, with the deciding pass on exactly the same lap as at the Caraway 150 (July). Loftin won the Star Country/Old Milwaukee 150 after a green-white-checkered extended the event by ten laps. Northern Modified star Ted Christopher captured his only career series race at the North vs. South Shootout Qualifier, holding off Tim Brown on a green-white-checkered. At the season finale, and ultimately the final race of the S.M.A.R.T. era, Brian Loftin captured the victory by edging out L.W. Miller. However, Miller would beat Loftin by 116 points to win his second straight season championship. There were six different winners during the season. L.W. Miller and Brian Loftin each won four races, tying to lead all drivers in wins.

2004 top 10 points standings

In late 2004, NASCAR announced it was taking over the S.M.A.R.T. Tour and bringing it under the NASCAR banner.

NASCAR Tour era

The NASCAR Whelen Southern Modified Tour was established in 2005, taking over what had formerly been the Southern Modified Auto Racing Tour (SMART) after the collapse of the organization as part of the breakup of the American Speed Association in late 2004. Whelen Industries, who sponsors the NASCAR Whelen Modified Tour agreed to sponsor the Southern Tour series, which became the Whelen Southern Modified Tour.

2005 season

The inaugural NASCAR era season held 12 events, beginning on March 26 at Caraway Speedway and ended on October 29 at Ace Speedway. The inaugural event for the NASCAR Whelen Southern Modified Tour was the Southern Modified Tour 150 at Caraway Speedway on March 26. Burt Myers won the first pole for the NASCAR era of the southern-based Modified Tour. While leading the event Jay Hedgecock had to pulled his car into the pits on the 65th lap with an engine problem. Ted Christopher, a star driver on the northeastern-based NASCAR Whelen Modified Tour, inherited the lead from Hedgecock and paced the field for the remaining laps on his way to the victory. In the April 16th race at Caraway, the tour's 3rd race under NASCAR sanction, Burt Myers led the first 145 laps but fellow rival Junior Miller stayed on his back bumper for most of the race. Miller and Myers bumped and banged and racing each other hard lap after lap. Miller made the pass for the lead on Myers with only 5 laps remaining to score the victory. At the July 1 event at Caraway Bud Pole winner Jay Hedgecock was on point. Hedgecock had lapping all but the top 8 cars, but Brian Crammer was coming as he had worked his way from his 11th place starting spot to 2nd by the halfway point. Crammer had been chasing down Hedgecock during the 2nd half and caught Hedgecock with 20 laps to go. Crammer began putting hard pressure on Hedgecock with 10 to go and with 5 to go made a move on Hedgecock coming off of turn 2. Hedgecock and Crammer  bumped wheels resulting in Crammer being sent spinning while Hedgecock kept the lead. Crammer retaliated under the caution by hitting Hedgecock's car but Hedgecock was able to continue. A crash during the green-white-checker attempt sent the race over its scheduled distance. Hedgecock's car ran out of gas before the race was red flagged during track clean up. Brian Loftin inherited the lead for the next another green-white-checkered attempt and held off Tim Brown for the win. Burt Myers was the fastest in qualifying for the Advance Auto Parts 199 at Bowman Gray Stadium, but drew the 5th starting position. This was the tour's first visit to Bowman Gray Stadium, the track many tour drivers call home, since 1992. Hedgecock led the first 71 laps until a spinning car hit the infield and shot dirt onto the track coming out of the 4th turn. Hedgecock's car skidded in the dirt and careened into the outside guardrail as Tim Brown zipped past into the lead. Brown stayed there until the lap 137 when Myers squeezed inside and completed a pass. Myers held off the win-hungry Tim Brown in the end. The Made in America Whelen 300 at Martinsville Speedway was a combo race for both Modified Tours. The Event was the first NASCAR Modified Tour event held at the track since 2002 and the first night race held at the historic .526-mile track. Ted Christopher won the overall event as Brian Loftin was the top-finishing driver from the Southern Tour, finishing 12th, but credited as first-place towards the Southern Modified Tour. A special Twin 100-lap event was held at Ace Speedway as a Labor Day doubleheader. Burt Myers won the first 100-lap race while Junior Miller got the win in the second 100-lap race. Jay Hedgecock won his 4th Pole of the season at the 6th and final season visit to Caraway Speedway. Hedgecock lead 115 of the first 133 laps and looked to be closing in on his first win of the season. Hedgecock's season of bad luck continued as during a caution period on lap 134 Hedgecock came into the pits with engine trouble ending his night. Brian Loftin held off a hard-charging Junior Miller over the final laps to win. Jay Hedgecock finally avoided any bad luck at the season finale, Whelen 150, at Ace Speedway. Hedgecock lead all 150 lap and won easily over 2nd place Brian Loftin. Junior Miller, By finishing 8th, won the 2005 Inaugural NASCAR Whelen Southern Modified Tour Championship. There were 5 different winners during the season with Brian Loftin winning the most with 4. Junior Miller was voted the most popular driver during the season.

 *Martinsville WMT and WSMT combo race. Highest finishing WSMT driver credited a win.

2005 Top 10 points standings

2006 season

The 2006 season held 13 events, beginning on March 25 at Caraway Speedway and ended on October 21 at Southern National Motorsports Park. Northern tour driver Ted Christopher won the season opener at Caraway for the second year in a row. Junior Miller would win the next two races before L.W. Miller won the forth race of the season at Motor Mile Speedway. It was L.W. Miller's first win in the series under the NASCAR banner. Junior Miller won his third win of the year at the next event. At the Bowman Gray event Burt Myers won the pole and started fourth after an inversion, but crashed on the second lap of the race dropping him from contention. Lee Jeffreys led the first 157 laps before dropping out with brake issues opening the door for Burt's brother, Jason Myers, to take over the lead. Jason Myers would lead the final 42 laps to win his first Southern Modified Tour event. Tim Brown would claim the southern tour win in the Martinsville combo race. Rookie   Brian King won his first tour race at Ace Speedway on August 15. in the season final race at Southern National Junior Miller won the race and his second straight championship by 6 points over Tim Brown. There were 6 different winners during the season with Junior Miller winning the most with 6. Junior Miller also was voted the most popular driver for the second straight year. Brian King was the Rookie of the Year.

 *Martinsville WMT & WSMT combo race. Highest finishing WSMT driver credited a win.

2006 top 10 points standings

2007 season

The 2007 season had 12 events, beginning on March 24 at Caraway Speedway and ended on October 6 also at Caraway Speedway. L.W. Miller won the season opener. At the second event of the year Andy Seuss won his first tour win and the first Southern Modified Tour event at the Music City Motorplex (Nashville Speedway). At the Bowman Gray event after a crash took out Frank Fleming, who had led the first 194 laps, Burt Myers passed John Smith on the last lap to pick up his only Southern Mod victory of the season. It was Myers' first victory on the tour in over a year. L.W. Miller won the championship over Tim Brown by 25 points. There were 6 different winners in the season with L.W. Miller winning the most with 5 victory's. L.W. Miller also was the most popular driver for the season and Wesley Swartout was the Rookie of the Year.

 *Martinsville WMT & WSMT combo race. Highest finishing WSMT driver credited a win.

2007 top 10 points standings

2008 season

The 2008 season had 11 events, beginning on March 22 at Caraway Speedway and ended on October 4 at Caraway Speedway. L.W. Miller opened the season by winning the first two events before Brian Loftin won the next 3 events. At the next event at Lanier Speedway, the series' first race there, George Brunnhoelzl III won his first tour victory. Burt Myers scores his lone tour race of the season at Southern National Raceway Park. Brian Loftin won the championship by 30 points over Tim Brown. It was Brown's 3rd straight season finishing runner-up in points to 3 different champions. There were 6 different winners in the season with Brian Loftin's 4 victory's leading the tour. Bobby Hutchens was the most popular driver for the season and Buddy Emory was the Rookie of the Year.

 *Martinsville WMT & WSMT combo race. Highest finishing WSMT driver credited a win.

2008 top 10 points standings

2009 season

The 2009 season had 14 events, beginning on March 21 at Concord Motorsport Park and ended on October 24 at Caraway Speedway. Ted Christopher won the season opener. Christopher and Andy Seuss would alternate victory's in the first 4 events. George Brunnhoelzl III won his first race of the season in the 5th event of the season at Caraway Speedway. At the Advance Auto Parts 199 at Bowman Gray, George Brunnhoelzl III and John Smith would trade the lead back and forth for most of the race. Smith lead 105 laps and Brunnhoelzl 60 laps with Burt Myers the only other driver to lead a lap until a crash on lap 167 took out most of the cars remaining in the race. L.W. miller made it back to the line first to lead a lap after the accident but was forced to immediately make a pit stop for the damage his had from the wreck. Luke Fleming who was making his Tour debut driving in his father's car, avoided the crash and took over the race with 32 laps to go. Fleming would lead the rest of the event to claim the upset victory in his only start of the season. Brunnhoelzl who had major suspension damage from the big crash would finish 2nd. Only 8 cars were running at the finish, only 3 on the lead lap. Gene Pack finished 3rd, L.W. Miller was 4th (2 laps down), and Bryan Dauzat 5th (7 laps down). George Brunnhoelzl III won the last two races and the championship. There were 6 different winners in the season with George Brunnhoelzl III's 5 victory's the most on the tour. Andy Seuss was the most popular driver for the season. No Rookie of the Year award was given out as no rookies ran for the award.

 *Martinsville & Bristol WMT & WSMT combo races. Highest finishing WSMT driver credited a win.

2009 top 10 points standings

2010 season

The 2010 season had 10 events, beginning on March 5 at Atlanta Motor Speedway's infield Oval track and ended on October 14 at Charlotte Motor Speedway's infield Oval track. Corey Lajoie, son of 2-time Nationwide Series Champion Randy Lajoie, passed Tim Brown with 6 laps to go and won his first win in his first start in the Series. Five different drivers won the first Five races of the season. In the 9th Event of the season at Tri-County Motor Speedway Burt Myers made a dive-bomb pass against the infield wall down the backstretch on leader John Smith that stuck and won Myers his first victory of the season. In the season ending race James Civali came into the event with the points lead but during the race was parked by NASCAR official's for an incident involving him retaliated at L.W. Miller while the race was under cation laps. Burt Myers had a dominant race, leading all but one lap, to win his second victory in a row. The Victory moved Myers from 4th in points to win the title by 31 points over L.W. Miller. There were 7 different winners in the 10 race season with Burt Myers, James Civali and Andy Seuss each winning 2 races as the most on the tour. Burt Myers was the most popular driver for the season and Greg Butcher was the Rookie of the Year.

 * Bristol WMT & WSMT combo races. Highest finishing WSMT driver credited a win.

2010 top 10 points standings

2011 season

 * Bristol WMT & WSMT combo races. Highest finishing WSMT driver credited a win.

2011 top 10 points standings

2012 season

 * Bristol WMT & WSMT combo races. Highest finishing WSMT driver credited a win.

2012 top 10 points standings

2013 season

 * Bristol WMT & WSMT combo races. Highest finishing WSMT driver credited a win.

2013 top 10 points standings

2014 season

 * Bristol WMT & WSMT combo races. Highest finishing WSMT driver credited a win.

2014 top 10 points standings

2015 season

 * Bristol WMT & WSMT combo races. Highest finishing WSMT driver credited a win.

2015 top 10 points standings

2016 season

 * Bristol WMT and WSMT combo races. Highest finishing WSMT driver credited a win.

2016 Top 10 points standings

Merger with the Modified Tour
In 2016, after 12 years as a NASCAR series, NASCAR decided to drop the Southern Modified Tour and combine them with the northern tour starting in 2017.

Tour champions

SMART Modified Tour champions

Whelen Southern Modified Tour champions

Champions

SMART Modified Tour

NASCAR Whelen Southern Modified Tour

Overall

Type of Race Cars & Rules

The tour features 600 horsepower open-wheeled modified's which run 15" wide Hoosier tires to give the cars added traction to attain speeds of up to 125 mph on some of the fastest short tracks in the South. Rules are similar to those used by the NASCAR Modified Tour. Cars must have a minimum weight of 2,900 pounds, maintain a wheelbase between 101 and 105 inches, and using 350 to 358 cubic-inch engines.

As the S.M.A.R.T. tour, the series added excitement to each event by allowing each competitor two laps of qualifying to determine their starting positions. Once these positions are established, the six fastest qualifiers draw numbers between 1 and 6. This shake up of the front runners adds to the action by letting the top six determine who is fastest competitor versus the fastest qualifier. Another exciting feature of the S.M.A.R.T. tour was that while all laps run under caution are counted, each race must end under green flag conditions insuring the fans will witness an exciting down-to-the-wire finish at each event.

Tracks

2016 venues
Bowman Gray Stadium – Winston-Salem, NC (1/4 Mile Oval)
Bristol Motor Speedway – Bristol, TN (1/2 Mile Oval)
Caraway Speedway – Asheboro, NC (.455 Mile Oval)
Charlotte Motor Speedway Legends Track – Concord, NC (1/4 Mile Oval)
Concord Speedway - Midland, NC (1/2 Mile Oval)
East Carolina Motor Speedway - Robersonville, NC (4/10 Mile Oval)
South Boston Speedway – South Boston, VA (4/10 Mile Oval)

Former NASCAR venues (2005–2016)
Ace Speedway – Altamahaw, NC (4/10 Mile Oval)
Daytona International Speedway Short Track - Daytona Beach, FL (3/8 Mile Oval)
Fairgrounds Speedway – Nashville, TN (.590 Mile Oval)
Greenville-Pickens Speedway – Greenville, SC (1/2 Mile Oval)
Hickory Motor Speedway - Newton, NC (.333 Mile Oval) (has hosted NWSMT in the past, once in 2010)
Langley Speedway – Hampton, VA (.395 Mile Oval)
Lanier Raceplex – Braselton, GA (.375 Mile Oval)
Martinsville Speedway – Ridgeway, VA (1/2 Mile Oval)
Motor Mile Speedway – Radford, VA (.416 Mile Oval)
Myrtle Beach Speedway – Myrtle Beach, SC (.530 Mile Oval)
New Hampshire Motor Speedway - Loudon, NH (1.058 Mile Oval)
Southern National Motorsports Park – Kenly, NC (4/10 Mile Oval)
Thompson Speedway Motorsports Park – Thompson, CT (.625 Mile Oval)
Thunder Ring at Atlanta Motor Speedway – Hampton, GA (1/4 Mile Oval)
Tri-County Motor Speedway – Hudson, NC  (.4 Mile Oval)

S.M.A.R.T. era venues (1989–2004)
Anderson Motor Speedway - Anderson, SC (.375 Mile Oval)
Coastal Plains Speedway - Jacksonville, NC (.4 Mile Oval)
Franklin County Speedway - Callaway, VA (.333 Mile Oval)
Friendship Motor Speedway - Elkin, NC (.4 Mile Oval)
Gresham Motorsports Park - Jefferson, GA (1/2 Mile Oval)
Lonesome Pine Raceway - Coeburn, VA (.375 Mile Oval)
North Wilkesboro Speedway - North Wilkesboro, NC (5/8 Mile Oval)
Summerville Speedway - Summerville, SC (1/2 Mile Oval)

Winners table

Most wins at each track

Current tracks

Former tracks

Rookie of the Year Award

Most Popular Driver Award

Notes and references

See also
 NASCAR
 Whelen Modified Tour
 NASCAR Home Tracks
 2014 NASCAR Whelen Southern Modified Tour

External links
NASCAR
NASCAR's Whelen Modified Tour
NASCAR's Whelen Souther Modified Tour
2008 Whelen Southern Modified Tour Schedule
ModSeriesScene.com
SouthernModified.com

NASCAR series
Whelen southern